Milionář (English translation: Millionaire) was a Czech game show based on the original British format of Who Wants to Be a Millionaire?. The show was hosted by Roman Šmucler. The main goal of the game was to win 2,000,000 Kč by answering 15 multiple-choice questions correctly. There were 4 lifelines - fifty fifty (50:50), phone a friend (přítel na telefonu), ask the audience (rada publika) and switch the question (výměna otázky). The game show was shown on the Czech TV station Prima TV. When a contestant got the fifth question correct, he left with at least 10,000 Kč. When a contestant got the tenth question correct, he left with at least 80,000 Kč. Earlier, the game show was called Chcete být milionářem?.

Payout Structure

Big winners 
No contestant won the top prize in this version. The biggest winner is Jiří Lener, who won 500,000 Kč on 7 March 2008.

300,000 Kč winners 
 Výherce Robert Chylík (18 February 2008)
 Čeněk Matocha (26 February 2008)
 Vratislav Šteiner (21 May 2008)
 Miroslav Štorch (13 June 2008)
 Laco Kajaba (23 June 2008)

160,000 Kč winners 
 Zdeňka Jírová (18 March 2008)
 Štěpán Molt (11 April 2008)
 Tomáš Zavázal (22 April 2008)
 Miroslav Keřka (5 May 2008)
 Vladimíra Vondráková (9 May 2008)
 Ivan Vasilev (13 May 2008)
 Jan Hošek (23 May 2008)
 Zdeněk Novák (19 June 2008)

References

Who Wants to Be a Millionaire?
Czech game shows
2008 Czech television series debuts
2008 Czech television series endings
2000s Czech television series
Prima televize original programming
Czech television series based on British television series

cs:Milionář (televizní soutěž)